The Zhejiang-Jiangxi campaign or the Chekiang–Kiangsi campaign (Japanese: 浙贛作戦), also known as Operation Sei-go (Japanese: せ号作戦), was a campaign by the China Expeditionary Army of the Imperial Japanese Army under Shunroku Hata and Chinese 3rd War Area forces under Gu Zhutong in Chinese provinces of Zhejiang and Jiangxi from mid May to early September 1942.

Japanese troops used biological weapons against Chinese soldiers and civilians alike. Japanese soldiers also committed massacres throughout the battle, resulting in over 300,000 Chinese deaths. Shunroku Hata, the commander of Japanese forces involved in the massacre of the 250,000 Chinese civilians, was sentenced in 1948 in part due to his "failure to prevent atrocities". He was given a life sentence but was paroled in 1954 after only serving six years.

Background 
On April 18, 1942, the United States launched the Doolittle Raid, an attack by 16 B-25 Mitchell bombers from the aircraft carrier  on Tokyo, Nagoya, and Yokohama. The original plan was for the aircraft to bomb Japan and land at airfields in unoccupied portion of China. Because the raid had to be launched earlier than planned, all but one of the aircraft (which against orders diverted to the Soviet Union) ran out of fuel and crashed in Chinese provinces of Zhejiang and Jiangxi or the offshore islands.

Sixty-four American airmen parachuted into the area around Zhejiang. Most were given shelter by Chinese civilians but eight Americans were captured by Japanese troops; three were shot after a show trial for "crimes against humanity".

The campaign 
Imperial General Headquarters was aware of possible air attacks from Chinese territory on Japan. Two days before the Doolittle Raid, Headquarters set up an operational plan with the goal of defeating Chinese forces and destroying air bases. The operation started on May 15, 1942, with 40 infantry battalions and 15-16 artillery battalions of the Imperial Japanese Army.
 
Japanese troops conducted a massive search for American airmen and in the process whole towns and villages that were suspected of harboring the Americans were burned to the ground and many civilians executed. The Japanese also wanted to occupy the area to prevent American air force from ever using airfields in China that could put the Japanese mainland within reach.

Aftermath 
When Japanese troops moved out of the Zhejiang and Jiangxi areas in mid-August, they left behind a trail of devastation. Chinese estimates put the civilian death toll at 250,000. The Imperial Japanese Army had also spread cholera, typhoid, plague-infected fleas and dysentery pathogens. The Japanese biological warfare Unit 731 brought almost 300 pounds of paratyphoid and anthrax to be left in contaminated food and contaminated wells with the withdrawal of the army from areas around Yushan, Kinhwa and Futsin. Around 1,700 Japanese troops died out of a total 10,000 Japanese soldiers who fell ill with disease when their biological weapons attack rebounded on their own forces.

Shunroku Hata, the commander of Japanese forces involved of the massacre of 250,000 Chinese civilians, was sentenced 1948 in part due to his "failure to prevent atrocities". He was given a life sentence but was paroled in 1954.

See also
Order of Battle for Zhejiang-Jiangxi Campaign (1942)
Flying Tigers
Unit 731
Japanese war crimes

References

Notes

Bibliography 

James M. Scott. The Untold Story of the Vengeful Japanese Attack After the Doolittle Raid

1942 in China
1942 in Japan
Zhejian-Jiangxi 1942
Military history of Jiangxi
Military history of Zhejiang
Japanese war crimes
Mass murder in 1942
Massacres in China
Second Sino-Japanese War crimes
Massacres committed by Japan